Monte Vista, California may refer to:
 Monte Vista, Placer County, California

See also 
Monta Vista, Cupertino, California
Monte Vista, an area of Southwestern San Bernardino County was incorporated (1956) and renamed (1958) as Montclair, California